François Baudouin (1520 – 24 October 1573), also called Balduinus, was a French jurist, Christian controversialist and historian. Among the most colourful of the noted French humanists, he was respected by his contemporaries as a statesman and jurist, even as they frowned upon his perceived inconstancy in matters of faith: he was noted as a Calvinist who converted to Catholicism.

Life
He was born at Arras, then part of the Empire, and educated in the convent school at St. Vaast. Baudouin studied law in the University of Leuven with Mudaeus. He settled as an advocate in Arras, where he continued his studies, but was banned from the town in 1545 on charges of heresy due to his Calvinist leanings. He went to the court of the Emperor Charles V at Brussels, and then travelled extensively.

After brief stays in Paris, Strasbourg and Geneva – where he met and became an enemy of Calvin – he settled in 1549 in Bourges as a doctor and then professor of law, as a colleague of Baro and Duarenus. Rivalries with the latter led him to move to Strasbourg and, 1555, to Heidelberg, where his academic career reached its apogee.

Leaving his chair to engage in European confessional politics, Baudouin was unsuccessful in assisting with attempts to reconcile the Roman Catholic Church and the Reformation, for instance in the failed Colloquy at Poissy, and in mediation efforts in the Netherlands. In 1563, he re-converted to Catholicism and in 1569, he was called again to teach law at Angers. Before he could accompany his patron, Henry of Anjou – now King of Poland – to Kraków, he died 1573 in Paris of a fever.

Writings

Baudouin was a prolific writer on juridical and ecclesiastical topics. As a jurist, he established the palingenetic method of presentation of legal sources. His works include many substantial commentaries on Roman law. He was the first to reconstruct the original legislation of Justinian and to authenticate a text (the ‘Octavius’) of the early Christian writer Minucius Felix (200-400). Baudouin had produced a monograph on the Emperor Constantine in 1556.

He wrote a study of a major dispute between Catholics and Donatists (and the Emperor Constantine's first large-scale dealing with the Christian church), the episcopal election of Carthage in 313.

Selected bibliography
 Justiniani Leges De re rustica (1542)
 Justiniani Institutionem seu Elementorum libri quattuor (1545)
 Juris civilis Schola Argentinensis (1555), a teaching program for jurists
 Constantinus Magnus, seu de constantini imperatoris legibus ecclesiasticis atque civilibus (1556/1612), a commentary on Constantine's fragments from the Codex Justinianus
 Commentarius ad edicta veterum principium Romanorum de christianis (1557)
 Minucii Felicis Octavius restitutus a Fr. Balduino (1560), as editor
 De Institutionae historiae universae: libri II: et ejus cum jurisprudencia conjunctione (1561)
 S. Optati libri sex de schismate donatistarum, cum Fr. Balduini praefatione (1563), as editor
 Discours sur le fait de la Réformation (1564)
 Historia Carthaginiensis collationis inter catholicos et donatistas, ex rerum ecclesiasticarum commentaries Fr. Balduini (1566). Parisiis [Paris], Apud Claudium Fremy 1566. First edition. 8vo., fols. [xvi] 100.
 Delibatio Africanae historiae, seu Optati libri VI, de schismate donatistarum et Victoris Uticensis libri III de persecutione Vandalorum cum Fr. Balduini annotationibus (1569), as editor
 Francisci Balduini ... opuscula varia / collecta, et denuo ed. a Goswino Josepho de Buininck. - Dusseldorpii : Stahl, 1765. digital

References

 
 
  which in turn cites:
 Niceron, Hommes Illustr. (Paris, 1734), XXVIII, 255-277.
 Rass, Convertiten (Freiburg, 1866), II, 176-187.
 Schaumkell, Der Rechtsgelehrte F. Balduinus (1894).
 Erbe, Michael,  François Bauduin (1520-1573). Biographie eines Humanisten Gütersloh 1978| publisher Mohn | page 312.
 Turchetti, Mario, Concordia o Tolleranza? François Bauduin (1520-1573) e i "Moyenneurs", Milano 1984 (isbn ??) | publisher Franco Angeli | page 649

External links
 

1520 births
1573 deaths
People from Arras
16th-century French lawyers
French Renaissance humanists
16th-century French writers
16th-century male writers
Roman Catholic writers
16th-century Roman Catholics
French Roman Catholics
French male non-fiction writers